The 2017 Limerick Senior Hurling Championship was the 123rd staging of the Limerick Senior Hurling Championship since its establishment by the Limerick County Board in 1887.

Group stage

Group 1

Group 1 Table

Group 1 Round 1

Group 1 Round 2

Group 1 Round 3

Group 1 Round 4

Group 1 Round 5

Group 2

Group 2 Table

Group 2 Round 1

Group 2 Round 2

Group 2 Round 3

Group 2 Round 4

Group 2 Round 5

Knock-out Stage

The winners of the two groups go straight into the semi-finals. The second and third place teams compete in the two 
quarter finals.

Quarter-finals

Semi-finals

Final

Limerick Senior Hurling Championship
Limerick